Schiavone (feminine Schiavona, plural Schiavoni) is an Italian ethnonym literally meaning "Slavs" in Old Venetian: originally, this term indicated origins in the lands of Dalmatia and Istria (in present-day Slovenia and Croatia), when under the rule of the Republic of Venice. Today it is an Italian surname.

History
The importance of Schiavoni's role in the Venetian Republic is best shown by the name of one of the main streets in Venice, Riva degli Schiavoni, just in front of the Doge Palace and San Marco Square.

A number of artists who worked in Italy who were of Slavic descent were nicknamed Schiavone by their origin: most famous among them are Giulio Clovio, Francesco Laurana, and Luciano Laurana.

Schiavone was also a designation of the Oltremarini, a military unit of the same descent in the Venetian Navy. The basket-hilted sword schiavona was also named after the Schiavone.

Surname
In Italy, the surname Schiavone mostly occurs in the southernmost regions of the mainland, namely Campania and Apulia, but it is also common in Rome, Turin, Milan, and Syracuse. Thanks to emigration, branches of the Schiavone family can also be found in Argentina, Brazil, Malta, Uruguay, Luxembourg, United Kingdom, the Philippines the United States, and Canada

Toponymy
 Ginestra degli Schiavoni, a village in Campania, Italy
 Riva degli Schiavoni, a promenade in Venice, Italy
 San Giacomo degli Schiavoni, a village in Molise, Italy
 Scuola di San Giorgio degli Schiavoni, a historical building in Venice, Italy
 Villa Schiavoni near Nepezzano, Teramo, Abruzzo, Italy

People
Alessandra De Rossi (born 1984), Philippine actress, real name Alessandra Schiavone
Andrea Schiavone, Venetian artist
Assunta De Rossi (born 1983), Philippine actress, real name Assunta Schiavone
Francesca Schiavone, (born 1980), Italian tennis player
Francesco Schiavone, (born  1953), member of the Camorra crime syndicate
Giorgio Schiavone (Juraj Ćulinović, 1433-1504) Dalmatian painter, active in Padua, Italy
Joe Schiavoni, American politician
Laura Schiavone, Italian rower.
Patricio Schiavone, (born 1985), Argentine actor
Patrick Schiavone, American Ford F-150 designer
Tony Schiavone (born 1957), American professional wrestling announcer
The Laurie Sisters, née Schiavone, American pop singers and sisters:
Phyllis "Cathy" Schiavone (1927–2020)
Caroline "Carole" Schiavone (1928–1994)
Greta "Rita" Schiavone (1930–2020)

See also 
Schiavo
Schiavonetti
Schiavelli

References

Ethnonyms
History of Dalmatia
Italian-language surnames
Venetian Slavs